Admiralgården is a converted warehouse located at Admiralgade 17 in central Copenhagen, Denmark. It was built for the same company as the nearby Sundorph House (Ved Stranden 10) and was originally used for storing tea. It was listed on the Danish registry of protected buildings and places by the Danish Heritage Agency on 5 March 1945 and is now owned by Bent Fabricius-Bjerre and his two sons through the real estate company Metorion..

History
 
The warehouse was built in 1797 for the widow Mette Christine Sundorph née . She was the owner of Mette Christine sal. Sundorphs Enke & Co. ("Metta Christine late Sundorph's Widow & Co.), a company which she had taken over after her second husband's death in 1794. Its premises had been completely destroyed in the Copenhagen Fire of 1795 and it therefore had to be operated from intermistic premises on Slotsholmen until the Sundorph House at Ved Stranden 10 and the warehouse in Admiralgade were completed in 1797.

The building was listed on the Danish registry of protected buildings and places by the Danish Heritage Agency on 5 March 1945. It was renovated under supervision of the architect Kay Kørbing (born 1915) in 1969-1970. It was acquired by Bent Fabricius-Bjerre in 1997 and then subject to another refurbishment.

Architecture
The four-storey warehouse has a central row of large openings with wooden shutters tipped by a tall dormer with the remains of a hoist. To the rear is a three-storey, one-bay side wing and a three-storey, three-bay warehouse which both date from some time between 1797 and 1806.

Today
The building is owned by Bent Fabricius-Bjerre and his two sons through the real estate company Metorion. It contains a mixture of offices and apartments.

References

External links
 Official website

Warehouses in Copenhagen
Listed warehouses in Denmark
Commercial buildings completed in 1797
Commercial buildings in Copenhagen